Dębołęka  is the village in the administrative district of Gmina Wałcz within Wałcz County  West Pomeranian Voivodeship in north-western Poland, it lies approximately  north-west of Wałcz and  east of the regional capital Szczecin, it is mainly surrounded by farm land, the village has a population of 380.

References

Villages in Wałcz County